The 101st Infantry Battalion (Separate) was an independent battalion on the US Army designed to be formed of Austrian-Americans and Austrian Nationals resident in the United States.

History
In 1942 the United States created several separate infantry battalions composed of Americans of ethnic descent or citizens of certain nations who were not yet American citizens. Amongst them were the  99th Infantry Battalion of Norwegian-Americans, the 100th Infantry Battalion  of Japanese-Americans, and the 122nd Infantry Battalion of Greek-Americans.  A Polish unit was also proposed but never created.

Zita of Bourbon-Parma, the wife of the last Emperor of Austria supposedly lobbied the American government for such a unit following President Franklin D. Roosevelt's officially declared restoration of an independent Austria to be an American war aim.  Three of her sons Carl, Charles, Rudolf and Felix von Habsburg served in the unit that served at Camp Atterbury, Indiana. Werner von Trapp also served in the Battalion.

The battalion was disbanded on June 16, 1943.

Notes

External links 
 http://www.indianamilitary.org/Camp%20Atterbury/Austrian%20Bn/Austrian%20BN.htm

Infantry battalions of the United States Army
Austrian-American history
Military units and formations established in 1942
Military units and formations disestablished in 1943
1942 establishments in the United States
1943 disestablishments in the United States